Efxeinoupoli (Greek: Ευξεινούπολη) is a small town in the Municipality of Almyros, Magnesia regional unit, Thessaly, Greece. Efxeinoupoli counts 2293 residents (2011).

History 

Efxeinoupoli was created in 1906. The first residents that came in the area were Greeks, refugees from Eastern Rumelia (de facto a part of Bulgaria). Firstly they were established in Almyros. The building of the town started on 29 September 1907. After the Greco-Turkish war (1919-1922) Greek refugees from Asia Minor came to the town of Efxeinoupoli.

The name of the town had been chosen to denote the origin of all those refugees from regions across the Euxeinos Pontos (Black Sea).

Sports

The town is the home of the Athletic Club A.E Dimitra Efxeinoupolis, who is participating in A' EPSTH.

References

External pages

Populated places in Magnesia (regional unit)